Noschkowitz is a hamlet which is a dependendency (ortsteil) of Ostrau, a municipality of Mittelsachsen kreis in Saxony, Germany. It is in the valley of the brook Rittmitzer, in the foothills a 16 kilometre drive from Lommatzsch . Noschkowitz lies at Latitude N 51°10'59.99", longitude E 13°10'0.01".

It is known for Schloss Noschkowitz, records of which date back to the 13th century.

Local notables 
Adolphus Zimmermann, Wisconsin brewer, legislator and local official, was a native of Noschkowitz.

References 

Mittelsachsen